Scandium monosulfide is a chemical compound of scandium and sulfur with the chemical formula ScS. Although its formula might suggest that it is a compound of scandium(II), i.e. [Sc2+][S2−], ScS is probably more realistically described as a pseudo-ionic compound, containing [Sc3+][S2−], with the remaining electron occupying the conduction band of the solid.

Structure
Scandium monosulfide adopts the sodium chloride crystal structure type.

Synthesis
Scandium monosulfide can be prepared by heating a mixture of scandium metal and powdered sulfur in the absence of air to 1150 °C for 70 hours.

Sc + S → ScS

References

Sulfides
Scandium compounds
Rock salt crystal structure